Yannick Chenevard (born 27 November 1959) is a French politician from La République En Marche!. He was elected as a deputy for Var's 1st constituency in the 2022 French legislative election.

References

See also 

 List of deputies of the 16th National Assembly of France

1959 births
Living people
People from Toulon
La République En Marche! politicians
21st-century French politicians
Politicians from Toulon
Mayors of Toulon

Deputies of the 16th National Assembly of the French Fifth Republic
Members of Parliament for Var